Miner 2049er is a platform game created by Bill Hogue that was released in 1982 by Big Five Software. It was developed for the Atari 8-bit family and widely converted to other systems. The title "Miner 2049er" evokes a 21st-century take on the circa-1849 California Gold Rush in which the gold miners and prospectors were nicknamed "49ers". It was the first Atari computer game, and by far the biggest release, from the previously TRS-80 focused company.

A key selling point was having ten different screens, which was a large number for a platform game at the time. For comparison, Donkey Kong (1981) has four screens (and its console versions only two or three).

An Atari 8-bit sequel with 25 screens, Bounty Bob Strikes Back, was published in 1984. It was ported to fewer systems than the original.

Plot
Bounty Bob is a member of the Royal Canadian Mounted Police on a mission to search through all of Nuclear Ned's abandoned uranium mines for the treacherous Yukon Yohan. Bob must claim each section of each mine by running over it. There are a wide variety of futuristic obstacles that he must deal with such as matter transporters, hydraulic scaffolds, and jet-speed floaters; plus, he must also avoid radioactive creatures that have been left behind in the mines.

Gameplay

As Bounty Bob, the player's goal is to inspect every section of each mine in search of the evil Yukon Yohan while avoiding the radioactive creatures that inhabit the mine. As Bounty Bob walks over a section of flooring, it fills with color. To complete the level, every section of flooring must be colored. There are ten mines in total (eleven in the ColecoVision version). Each level is timed and must be completed before the player runs out of oxygen.

Along the way, Bob encounters many objects left behind by past miners. By collecting these, bonus points are achieved and the radioactive creatures smile and change color. While in this state, Bob can collect them and earn extra points.

Obstacles in each mine aid and hinder Bob's progress. Ladders allow him to climb up or down to the next platform; matter transporters teleport him to other transporters in that mine, chutes slide Bob off a platform (often against his will), and pulverizers crush Bob if he gets in their way.  Most levels are defined by a unique element or obstacle.

Development
Big Five Software co-founders Bill Hogue and Jeff Konyu programmed games from 1980-82 for Radio Shack's TRS-80 Model I home computer. They created games patterned after arcade video games, such as Super Nova (Asteroids), Attack Force (Targ), Cosmic Fighter (Astro Fighter), Galaxy Invasion (Galaxian), Meteor Mission II (Lunar Rescue), Robot Attack (Berzerk), and Defense Command (Missile Command).

Hogue was originally going to write Miner 2049er for the TRS-80 Model I, but Radio Shack discontinued it in mid-1982, so he instead developed the game on the Atari 800. The game required 16k at a time when cartridges were normally 8k, so the company had to produce their own circuit boards holding two EPROMs. Early versions of the cartridges had a bug in the elevator code. Due to a production delay, it was first released on the Apple II.

Ports 

Miner 2049er was converted to the Apple II, IBM PC (as a self-booting disk), Commodore 64, VIC-20, Atari 5200, Atari 2600, TI-99/4A, and ColecoVision. For the Atari 2600, two separate cartridges were published by Tigervision, each containing three selected levels: Miner 2049er and Miner 2049er Volume II.

Reception
ANALOG Computing in 1982 called Miner 2049er "one of those rare games which looks as if it were designed, not just thrown together", praising its animation and large number of levels, and concluded that it "is a must-play game for the Atari". Softline in 1983 stated that the Apple version was a good conversion of the Atari version, which "You already knew ... was a great game".

The game reached #1 on the Softsel Hot List in 1983. The same year, Softline readers named the game the fourth most-popular Apple and sixth most-popular Atari program of 1983. Miner 2049er was awarded "1984 Electronic Game of the Year" at the 5th annual Arkie Awards, where the judges noted that the game was available on so many platform that it had become "the most widely played home electronic game of all time", and that "no home-arcade title has had the impact" that the game had. It also won an Outstanding Software Award from Creative Computing that year.

Computer and Video Games rated the ColecoVision version 82% in 1989.

Legacy 
Miner 2049er has been cited as the inspiration behind Manic Miner (1983) from Bug-Byte and Crystal Caves (1991) from Apogee Software. 

Sequels
Development of two games followed that featured Bounty Bob. The first, named Scraper Caper, had Bob acting as a fireman in a side-scrolling building, but that version was scrapped and they started over with an unnamed new game where Bob was chased by fireballs in 3D. Neither was considered appealing enough to release, and in 1985 an official sequel was released, Bounty Bob Strikes Back! for fewer systems than the original. It was the last game from both Hogue and Big Five.

Re-releases
A Game Boy version of the game with different graphics and levels was released by Mindscape in 1991.Miner 2049er was re-released in 2007 by Magmic for the mobile market. This version contains both a recreation of Hogue's original and the second a modernized version. The remake received an IGN Editor's Choice Award and won the Best Revival category in the Best of 2007 IGN awards. In 2011, Magmic added support for iOS devices.

Also in 2007 Hogue released an emulator coded in C++ with both Bounty Bob games in one package for Windows. The emulator was made available free of charge on the Big Five website. Hogue states that as neither game used any Atari ROM routines they are not necessary for the emulator to run.

An updated version of the game was announced in 2018 for the Intellivision Amico.

See also
 Canyon Climber (1982)
 Jumpman (1983)
 Mr. Robot and His Robot Factory'' (1983)

References

External links
Big Five Software's official web site
Miner 2049er for the Atari 8-bit family at Atari Mania

The Miner 2049er Museum

1982 video games
Apple II games
Atari 2600 games
Atari 5200 games
Atari 8-bit family games
Big Five Software games
BlackBerry games
ColecoVision games
Commodore 64 games
VIC-20 games
Game Boy games
IOS games
FM-7 games
NEC PC-8801 games
Platform games
Sharp X1 games
Single-player video games
TI-99/4A games
Video games about police officers
Video games developed in the United States
Video games set in the 2040s
Windows Mobile games
Mindscape games